Leila Guerriero (born 17 February 1967) is an Argentine journalist and writer.

Career
Leila Guerriero graduated from the Colegio Nacional Normal Superior de Junín. She studied tourism, a field in which she did not end up working. Her empirical start in journalism was in 1992 when she got her first job as editor at Página/30, a monthly magazine of the newspaper Página/12. After sending a story entitled "Kilómetro cero" to the paper's reception desk, she received, four days later, a call from the then director Jorge Lanata.

In addition, she is the Latin America editor for the Mexican magazine Gatopardo.

In 2014 she received a Konex Award Diploma of Merit in the Chronicles and Testimonies category.

Works
 Los suicidas del fin del mundo, chronicle of a Patagonian town, Tusquets, 2005, 
 Frutos extraños, collected chronicles 2001–2008, Alfaguara, 2009, 
 Los malditos, editor, Ediciones UDP, 2011 
 Plano americano, 21 profiles of artists originally published in diverse media, Ediciones UDP, 2013, 
 Una historia sencilla, Anagrama, 2013, 
 Zona de obras, Anagrama, 2015, 
 Cuba en la encrucijada: 12 perspectivas sobre la continuidad y el cambio en la habana y en todo el país, editor, Knopf Doubleday, 2018,

Awards
 2010 
 2014 Konex Award

References

1967 births
20th-century Argentine women writers
20th-century Argentine writers
21st-century Argentine women writers
21st-century Argentine writers
Argentine journalists
Argentine women journalists
Living people
People from Junín, Buenos Aires